The Astra-Gnome is a concept car by industrial designer Richard Arbib using a 1955 Nash Metropolitan chassis. Described as a "Time and Space Car", it features themes influenced by the space travel forms that were popular during the 1950s. The vehicle represented Arbib's vision of what an automobile would look like in the year 2000.

Design
American Motors Corporation commissioned Richard Arbib, a leading industrial designer of the 1950s, to develop a futuristic concept car. Built in four months, the Astra-Gnome represented the work of product stylists to create "new and exciting shapes, textures and colors in a functional car." Arbib had the wheels and tires hidden behind full fender skirts to achieve "a floating special quality" and to suggest a spacecraft or hovercraft. The objective was to build excitement "about the cool stuff the 21st century was going to hold."

The vehicle was featured on the 3 September 1956 cover of Newsweek magazine and was a highlight at the 1956 New York International Auto Show. About 1,000 questionnaire cards were distributed to viewers at the auto show, with results indicating an 80% favorable response to the prototype. Numerous photos were made of the car with Arbib, most often accompanied by attractive female models who explained to the media that the concept was never intended for production.

Despite a 25% increase in size over the original Metropolitan body, the total weight remains under . About  of aluminum castings and extrusions were used, including fluted aluminum side panels that had been anodized in different blending colors. The bubble canopy provides an unobstructed vision all around; this covered the passengers, but could be raised to allow walk-in entry and exit. The Nash Metropolitan features the body work by Andrew Mazzara of New York.

Among its many features is a Hamilton "celestial time-zone clock permitting actual flight-type navigation." The acrylic glass bubble canopy also served as a sound chamber for the car's high fidelity radio and record player. The car included air conditioning and wrap-around bumper protection that was matched to the height of full-sized car bumpers. The  width of the concept car was much greater than contemporary passenger automobiles and allowed for extra interior room, as well as storage and luggage spaces that included six pieces of matched integrated luggage.

The concept car "disappeared into oblivion" to be recovered from New York City in 1980. The car is restored and can be seen in a California museum.

See also
Nash Metropolitan

Notes

Concept cars
1950s cars